USS Greenling has been the name of more than one United States Navy ship, and may refer to:

 , a submarine in commission from 1942 to 1946
 , a submarine in commission from 1967 to 1994.

United States Navy ship names